Rocco and His Brothers is a 1960 drama film directed by Luchino Visconti and starring Alain Delon, Annie Girardot, Renato Salvatori, Katina Paxinou, Roger Hanin, Paolo Stoppa, and Claudia Cardinale in one of her early roles. Set in 1960 Milan, it tells the story of a migrant family from southern Italy and its disintegration in the society of the industrial north.

The film's title is a combination of the title of Thomas Mann's novel Joseph and His Brothers and Rocco Scotellaro, an Italian poet who described the feelings of the peasants of southern Italy. The screenplay, co-written by Visconti, is inspired by an episode from the novel Il ponte della Ghisolfa by Giovanni Testori.

A co-production between Italian studio Titanus and French production company Les Films Marceau, Rocco and His Brothers suffered from multiple controversies and setbacks in its pre-release period. It received a lukewarm response from Italian critics, but was more positively-received internationally, winning several accolades including the Special Jury Prize at the 21st Venice International Film Festival. Retrospective reviews were more positive, and the film is now highly-regarded in the canon of Italian cinema.

Plot
After the death of his father, Rocco Parondi, one of the five sons of a poor rural Italian family, travels north from Lucania to join his older brother Vincenzo in Milan, led by the matriarch Rosaria. She is the "hand to which the five fingers belong," and she has a powerful influence on her sons. Presented in five distinct sections, the film weaves the story of the five brothers Vincenzo, Simone, Rocco, Ciro and Luca Parondi as each of them adapts to his new life in the city.

Vincenzo, the eldest brother, is already living in Milan when his mother and brothers come to join him expecting to move in with him. An initial scene ensues between the Parondi family and Vincenzo's fiancée Ginetta's family, and the whole Parondi family moves in together. Despite early friction between Rosaria and Ginetta, he soon gets married and starts a family of his own. After settling down, Vincenzo doesn't interact much with the Parondi brothers.

Simone, the second brother, struggles to adapt to urban life. He becomes attracted to a prostitute named Nadia, who urges him to pursue a career in boxing, which his mother also encourages, as a fast way to reach fame and wealth. Nadia, after initially pursuing Vincenzo only to find him happy in his new family life, turns her interest to Simone. Simone falls in love with Nadia and demands far more than a casual relationship, but she rejects him.

Rocco, the third brother, leaves to complete military service in Turin and meets Nadia, who has just been released from prison for prostitution. His innocence and purity of heart ignites her to give up her way of life and enter an exclusive relationship with him. When Simone learns of this, he attacks Nadia and Rocco with a gang of friends and rapes Nadia to "teach Rocco a lesson". Rocco subsequently sacrifices his relationship with Nadia, telling her that he did not realize how much their relationship hurt his brother. Rocco insists that Nadia return to Simone, and she reluctantly complies.

Ciro, the second-youngest brother, perhaps by observing the trials of Simone and Rocco, decides to learn from their mistakes and mimic his brother Vincenzo. Unlike Vincenzo, Ciro still lives with his mother and participates in family matters. To that end, Ciro finds steady work in Milan at an automobile factory and becomes engaged to a local woman from a good family.

Rocco often acts to preserve the well-being of family members at some cost to his own happiness. He continues a boxing career without enjoying it to provide for his family and he covers for Simone in a myriad of ways, such as returning an expensive brooch that Simone stole from Rocco's boss. After Simone loses the ability to compete as a boxer, because of his obsession with Nadia, his alcoholism, and dissolute lifestyle, Rocco agrees to sign a long term boxing contract in order to pay back money that Simone squandered and cannot repay.  While Rocco fights and wins a championship bout, Simone kills Nadia in a jealous rage when she returns to prostitution and refuses to return to him.

As the family celebrates Rocco's victory, he shares an anecdote about masons, who, at the start of erecting a building, sacrifice a brick by throwing it into the shadow of the first passerby to ensure the structure will be sound and endure. Rocco's own habit of sacrificing his money and well-being can be likewise analogized, as attempts to preserve his family after their upheaval from country life. Simone arrives at the apartment and confesses to Nadia's murder. Despite his anguish, Rocco tries to protect Simone, but Ciro refuses to go along and leaves to turn Simone in to the police.

The youngest brother, Luca, does little but watch quietly in the background most of the time. By the end of the film he wants to return with Rocco to the south, despite spending the least time in southern Italy before the family moved to Milan. In one of the last scenes Ciro speaks to Luca outside his factory and tells him that Rocco won't return there, though he might, but will not find the south the same under the pressure of inevitable progress, and, though many people fear a changing world, he does not and believes that Luca will benefit from the changes.

Cast

 Alain Delon as Rocco Parondi
 Annie Girardot as Nadia
 Renato Salvatori as Simone Parondi
 Katina Paxinou as Rosaria Parondi
 Roger Hanin as Duilio Morini
 Spiros Focás as Vincenzo Parondi
 Claudia Cardinale as Ginetta, Vincenzo's fiancée
 Paolo Stoppa as Tonino Cerri
  as Ciro Parondi
 Rocco Vidolazzi as Luca Parondi
 Alessandra Panaro as Franca, Ciro's fiancée
 Suzy Delair as Luisa
 Claudia Mori as Raffaella
 Adriana Asti as Giannina
 Nino Castelnuovo as Nino Rossi
 Corrado Pani as Ivo
 Renato Terra as Alfredo, Ginetta's brother
  as Renzo
 Enzo Fiermonte as a boxer

Production 
Rocco and His Brothers was filmed in Milan during the Spring of 1960. Locations included Piazza del Duomo, the Milan Cathedral, and the Milano Centrale railway station. Other scenes were shot in Rome, Bellagio, and Civitavecchia. Renato Salvatori (Simone) and Annie Girardot (Nadia) romantically eloped during filming, and married two years later.

The production was beset by multiple setbacks. Luchino Visconti was denied multiple filming permits to locations that had been previously approved, and production was shut down on the orders after provincial premier Adrio Casati learned that the climactic murder scene would be filmed in a large recreational area in Idroscalo. Casati claimed it was due to an "inopportune resemblance to reality" of the scene to be shot to the recent murder of a young prostitute in the area. Visconti was forced to move shooting to Lazio, with the scene instead filmed at Lago di Fondi.

During post-production, Visconti re-dubbed and re-edited the film to change the characters' names from "Pafundi" to "Parondi." A local judge with the same name had threatened to sue the producers, under the mistaken belief that the film was about him.

Reception

Box office
The film was the 27th most popular film of the year in France. It sold 10,220,365 tickets in Italy.

Critical response
For The New York Times, Bosley Crowther, gave the film a positive review and appreciated the direction of the film and acting.

"A fine Italian film to stand alongside the American classic, The Grapes of Wrath, opened last night ...It is Luchino Visconti's Rocco and His Brothers (Rocco e i suoi fratelli), and it comes here garlanded with laurels that are quite as appropriate in this context as they are richly deserved...Signor Visconti has clearly conceived his film and that is what his brilliant handling of events and characters makes one feel. There's a blending of strong emotionalism and realism to such an extent that the margins of each become fuzzy and indistinguishable...Alain Delon as the sweet and loyal Rocco...is touchingly pliant and expressive, but it is Renato Salvatori...who fills the screen with the anguish of a tortured and stricken character. His raw and restless performance is overpowering and unforgettable...[and the] French actress Annie Girardot is likewise striking as the piteous prostitute..."

Variety lauded the drama, and wrote "With all its faults, this is one of the top achievements of the year in Italy...Scripting shows numerous hands at work, yet all is pulled together by Visconti's dynamic and generally tasteful direction. Occasionally, as in the near-final revelation to the family of Simone's crime, the action gets out of hand and comes close to melodrama. Yet the impact of the main story line, aided by the sensitive, expertly guided playing of Alain Delon as Rocco, Annie Girardot as the prostitute, and Renato Salvatori as Simone, is great. Katina Paxinou at times is perfect, at others she is allowed to act too theatrically and off-key."

Stanley Kauffmann of The New Republic wrote to him Rocco and His Brothers was "distended, sententious, ostentatiously frank, fundamentally trite, and thematically unsuccessful".

Retrospective reviews 
When the film was released in DVD format, critic Glenn Erickson wrote "A major pleasure of Rocco and His Brothers is simply seeing its portrait of life in working-class Milan in 1960. Beautifully directed in the housing projects and streets of the city, this is a prime example of a film which will accrue historical interest simply because it shows so much of how people lived and what places looked like (now) 40 years ago."

Martin Scorsese lists the film on his "35 foreign films to see before you die." Francis Ford Coppola cited Rocco and His Brothers as an inspiration for The Godfather (1972). In 2008, Roger Ebert added Rocco to his Great Movies list.

Censorship 
On October 27, twenty days after the premiere, the film's release was blocked and the negative seized after Domenico Tardini, the Cardinal Secretary of State, requested that Italian officials take action against "certain destructive films". They demanded that four scenes, including the murder of Nadia, be cut or the film would be confiscated and the producer prosecuted. After negotiations, Goffredo Lombardo agreed to darken the critical scenes within the film with filters; two of these darkened scenes were later omitted entirely. Visconti was never informed of these changes. The deleted scenes were later restored for home video releases.

Awards and nominations

In popular culture 
The German artist collective Rocco und seine Brüder take their name from the film.

References

External links
 
 
 
 
 Rocco and His Brothers at DVD Beaver (includes images).
 
 Palestra Visconti – one of the movie's location in Milan

1960 films
1960 drama films
1960s sports drama films
1960s Italian-language films
Italian sports drama films
Italian black-and-white films
Italian boxing films
French sports drama films
French black-and-white films
French boxing films
Films scored by Nino Rota
Films directed by Luchino Visconti
Films set in Milan
Social realism in film
Titanus films
Venice Grand Jury Prize winners
Films with screenplays by Suso Cecchi d'Amico
Films shot in Milan
Films shot in Rome
Films shot in Lazio
Italian epic films
French epic films
1960s Italian films
1960s French films